The Shisan Jing Zhushu is a famous Qing dynasty collection, edited by the scholar  Ruan Yuan (1764–1849) of the Thirteen Classics of Chinese literature, comparing many editions of each book, together with scholars' commentaries on the books. Ruan Yuan's version, considered the most careful, was originally published in 1815 and has been reprinted many times subsequently.

Chinese literature